The 1962 Los Angeles Dodgers season was the fifth for the team in Southern California, and the 73rd for the franchise in the National League. After spending the previous four seasons at the Los Angeles Memorial Coliseum, they began the season by opening Dodger Stadium, the team's new ballpark. The stadium opened on April 10 with a game against the Cincinnati Reds. The Dodgers proceeded to win a Los Angeles record 102 games and tied the San Francisco Giants for first place in the National League. The Giants won the ensuing playoff series two games to one.

Off-season 
 October 11, 1961: Gordie Windhorn and Bill Lajoie (minors) were traded by the Dodgers to the Kansas City Athletics for Stan Johnson, Bobby Prescott, and Jay Ward.
 December 15, 1961: Charlie Neal and a player to be named later were traded by the Dodgers to the New York Mets for Lee Walls and cash. The Dodgers completed the deal by sending Willard Hunter to the Mets on May 25, 1962.
 Prior to 1962 season: Duke Carmel was acquired from the Dodgers by the St. Louis Cardinals.
 March 24, 1962: Ramón Conde and Jim Koranda (minors) were traded by the Dodgers to the Chicago White Sox for Andy Carey.

Regular season 
The Los Angeles Times described the Dodgers' season as a "gamut of sublime" and "ridiculous", noting their successes—such as Maury Wills' 100 stolen bases breaking Ty Cobb's single-season record, Don Drysdale's 25 wins, and Sandy Koufax's no-hitter on June 30—together  with problems such as the 18 unearned runs the defense had allowed for the season behind Drysdale, and other fielding issues.

The Dodgers spent most of the early part of the season trying to keep pace with the San Francisco Giants, who established an early lead in the standings and continued to hold at least a share of that lead continuously from April 28 to June 7. At that point the Dodgers overtook the Giants, and for the next month the lead was traded between the two sides five times. The Giants held the lead for the last time on July 7. The Dodgers went 20–6 in July while the Giants went 16–11, allowing the Dodgers to take the league lead on July 8 and hold it until season's last regular game.

The Dodgers lost 10 of their final 13 games from September 16 to 30, while the Giants lost just 6 over the same span. While the schedule says the Dodgers lost the pennant in late September/early October, it was probably lost on July 17 in Cincinnati. That is when star left-hander Sandy Koufax left his start against the Reds in the first inning with a bruised tendon on his finger. Koufax would miss 58 games and approximately 13 starts due to the injury. At the time, Koufax was 14-5 with a league-best 2.15 ERA. The desperate Dodgers brought Koufax back on Sept. 21 when he was clearly not ready. He started three games, but lasted a total of 6 2/3 innings and gave up nine runs and went 0-2 along with a no-decision. However, with seven games remaining the Dodgers  were still ahead in the league by four games, and later held a two-game lead with three left to play.  They  entered their final game with a one-game lead over the Giants, but fell 1–0 to the St. Louis Cardinals. Meanwhile, the Giants won 2–1 over the Houston Colt .45's, after an eighth-inning home run by Willie Mays. These results left the Dodgers and Giants tied in the league at 101–61, necessitating a tie-breaker to decide the NL pennant.  The three-game tiebreaker series was considered part of the regular season for statistical purposes.  The Giants won game one, while the Dodgers took game two.  The Giants then took game three to capture the NL pennant.

Records and achievements

In 1962 two players set Los Angeles Dodgers team records that still stand. Tommy Davis, batting in the heart of the Dodgers' batting order, had a season that in another season might have earned him the National League Most Valuable Player (MVP) award. Davis set Dodger records with 230 hits and 153 runs batted in that have never been matched. In addition, Davis won the National League batting title with a .346 batting average, he scored 120 runs himself, and he also hit 27 doubles and 27 home runs. Davis finished third in the voting for the MVP trophy.

The winner of the MVP was Davis's teammate Maury Wills, who set the all-time Dodger record of 104 stolen bases. This was also a major league season record until it was broken in 1974 by Lou Brock. Wills also led the league in playing in all 165 of the Dodgers' games (including their three-game playoff with the Giants) and with 695 at-bats. The 165 games played in a single season remains an all-time major league record, and is unlikely to be broken under the current major league rules.  Wills totaled 208 hits and 130 runs scored, and he also led the league with 10 triples. To top it off, Wills won the Gold Glove at shortstop. All of this impressed the voters for the MVP more than Davis's performance did.

Maury Wills (104) and Willie Davis (32) set an MLB record with the most stolen bases by 2 teammates with 136. The Dodgers OF consisting of Tommy Davis in LF, Willie Davis in CF and Frank Howard in RF provided most Of the Power for the Dodgers as Tommy Davis hit 27 HRs with 153 RBIs - Willie Davis (who was voted the NL Sophomore Of the year in 1962) hit 21 HRs with 85 RBIs and Big Frank Howard jacked 31 HRs with 118 RBIs.

Another Dodger, Don Drysdale, won the Cy Young Award as the best pitcher in Major League Baseball. Drysdale led the league with 25 wins, 41 games started, 19 complete games, 314 innings pitched, and 232 strikeouts. He only suffered nine lost games, and he also finished fifth in the voting for the MVP trophy.

In addition, a young pitcher named Sandy Koufax had a breakthrough year of a kind for the Dodgers. Koufax led the league with an earned-run average (ERA) of 2.54, and this was first time that he had had an ERA nearly that low, and it was the first of five consecutive years in which he led the league in ERA in just 28 games pitched, Koufax has a won-loss record of 14–7, 11 complete games, and 216 strikeouts.

Season standings

Record vs. opponents

Opening Day lineup

Roster

Player stats

Batting

Starters by position 
Note: Pos = Position; G = Games played; AB = At bats; H = Hits; Avg. = Batting average; HR = Home runs; RBI = Runs batted in

Other batters 
Note: G = Games played; AB = At bats; H = Hits; Avg. = Batting average; HR = Home runs; RBI = Runs batted in

Pitching

Starting pitchers 
Note: G = Games pitched; IP = Innings pitched; W = Wins; L = Losses; ERA = Earned run average; SO = Strikeouts

Other pitchers 
Note: G = Games pitched; IP = Innings pitched; W = Wins; L = Losses; ERA = Earned run average; SO = Strikeouts

Relief pitchers 
Note: G = Games pitched; W = Wins; L = Losses; SV = Saves; ERA = Earned run average; SO = Strikeouts

Awards and honors 
National League Most Valuable Player
Maury Wills
Cy Young Award
Don Drysdale
Associated Press Athlete of the Year
Maury Wills
Gold Glove Award
Maury Wills
NL Player of the Month
Sandy Koufax (June 1962)
Frank Howard (July 1962)

Sporting News awards 
TSN Pitcher of the Year Award
Don Drysdale
TSN Major League Player of the Year Award
Maury Wills & Don Drysdale
TSN National League Player of the Year Award
Maury Wills

All-Stars 
1962 Major League Baseball All-Star Game −1st Game
Don Drysdale starter
Tommy Davis starter
Sandy Koufax reserve
Johnny Roseboro reserve
Maury Wills reserve
1962 Major League Baseball All-Star Game – 2nd Game
Johnny Podres starter
Tommy Davis starter
 Johnny Roseboro reserve
Maury Wills reserve
Major League Baseball All-Star Game MVP Award – Game 1
Maury Wills
TSN National League All-Star
Don Drysdale
Tommy Davis
Maury Wills

Farm system

Notes

References 
Baseball-Reference season page
Baseball Almanac season page

External links 
1962 Los Angeles Dodgers uniform
Los Angeles Dodgers official web site

Los Angeles Dodgers seasons
Los Angeles Dodgers season
Los Angel